Suckerfish or sucker may refer to:
 the remoras (family Echeneidae): ray-finned fishes that use suction to hold onto larger marine animals
 the family Catostomidae (suckers): freshwater fish found mostly in North America
 the species Hypostomus plecostomus (the suckermouth catfish), or other members of family Loricariidae
 Chinese sucker fish (Beaufortia kweichowensis): a hillstream loach species native to the riverine fauna of China

See also
 Sucker (disambiguation)
 Fish (disambiguation)
 Sucker barb (Barbichthys laevis), a ray-finned fish species
 Sucker catfish (disambiguation)
 Suckermouth